Attapady Kurumba, also called Pal Kurumba, is an unclassified Southern Dravidian language spoken by a Scheduled tribe of India. It shows only approximately 50% lexical similarity with the other South Dravidian languages named Kurumba, but up to 82% with Muduga and 52% with Kannada Kurumba; Attapady Kurumba, Muduga, and Irula each use their mother tongue when speaking to each other. Thudukki variety of Attapady Kurumba is reportedly most pure.

References

Dravidian languages